The 2014 Morocco Tennis Tour – Mohammedia was a professional tennis tournament played on clay courts. It was the first edition of the tournament which was part of the 2014 ATP Challenger Tour. It took place in Mohammedia, Morocco between 16 and 21 June 2014.

Singles main-draw entrants

Seeds

 1 Rankings are as of June 9, 2014.

Other entrants
The following players received wildcards into the singles main draw:
  Yassine Idmbarek
  Younès Rachidi
  Amine Ahouda
  Mehdi Jdi

The following players received entry from the qualifying draw:
  Fabiano de Paula
  Juan-Samuel Arauzo-Martinez
  Sherif Sabry
  Nicolás Jarry

Doubles main-draw entrants

Seeds

1 Rankings as of June 9, 2014.

Other entrants
The following pairs received wildcards into the doubles main draw:
  Mohamed Adnaoui /  Mamoun El Abbar
  Mehdi Jdi /  Younès Rachidi
  Amine Ahouda /  Yassine Idmbarek

Champions

Singles

 Pablo Carreño def.  Daniel Muñoz de la Nava, 7–6(7–2), 2–6, 6–2

Doubles

 Fabiano de Paula /  Mohamed Safwat def.  Richard Becker /  Elie Rousset, 6–2, 3–6, [10–6]

External links

Morocco - Mohammedia
Morocco Tennis Tour – Mohammedia
Mohammedia
Morocco Tennis Tour - Mohammedia